Eidstod is the centre of the village Vrådal in Kviteseid municipality, Telemark county, Norway.

It is located at the northern end of the Nisser lake.

Villages in Vestfold og Telemark